Common Lives/Lesbian Lives (CL/LL) was a collectively produced lesbian quarterly which published out of Iowa City, Iowa, from 1981 to 1996. The magazine had a stated commitment to reflect the diversity of lesbians by actively soliciting and printing in each issue the work and ideas of lesbians of color, Jewish lesbians, fat lesbians, lesbians over fifty and under twenty years old, disabled lesbians, poor and working-class lesbians, and lesbians of varying cultural backgrounds. Common Lives/Lesbian Lives was a cultural milestone in the lesbian publishing world, as it was one of the first lesbian journal or magazine published from outside the urban/coastal New York/Los Angeles/Berkeley scene.

History
CL/LL was initiated by eight lesbians who were living in the Los Angeles area in late 1980; Catherine Nicholson and Harriet Desmoines, co-founders of periodical Sinister Wisdom encouraged the women by stating that more lesbian journals were needed because Sinister Wisdom received more submissions than it could print. Cindy Cleary, Anne Lee, and Tracy Moore (Moore had been involved in the collective that published Iowa City's feminist newsletter Ain't I a Woman? from 1971 to 1974) formed the core group of the journal, and all worked on the magazine after their move to Iowa City later that year.

The existence of the Iowa City Women's Press and a typesetting firm owned and operated by women made Iowa City an inviting home for the new journal.

The first issue of Common Lives/Lesbian Lives was published in 1981, and the journal eventually reached a peak circulation of about 2500 national and international subscribers. When the journal's main distributor, Inland, declared bankruptcy in 1995, CL/LL was no longer able to continue publication.

Content
The publishing collective wanted the magazine to be "inclusive, non-academic, diverse and accessible" Most contributors had never been published before.

All work published in CL/LL was produced by self-defined lesbians, and all of the project's volunteers were lesbians. Due to this policy, a complaint was filed with the University of Iowa Human Rights Commission by a heterosexual woman who believed she was discriminated against when not hired to be an intern. A complaint was also lodged with the University of Iowa Human Rights Commission by a bisexual woman whose submission to the magazine was not published.

The University of Iowa printing department refused to print Issue 20 (1982) because it contained photographs of lesbians making love, and the magazine sued the university and won.

The 1995 fall issue was not published, and eventually Issue 56, which was to be the last, was published as the 1995–1996 issue.  Despite efforts to raise money, Common Lives/Lesbian Lives officially closed in 1997.

Archives
The Iowa Women's Archives in the University of Iowa Libraries now hosts Cl/LL archival material.

The Lavender Library, Archives and Cultural Exchange in Sacramento, California holds a substantial collection of the magazines.

Contributors
Some of the contributors to the magazine include: Elana Dykewomon, Tee Corinne, Sapphire, Hawk Madrone, Julia Penelope, Candis Graham, Martha Miller, and Ruth Mountaingrove,

See also
 Lesbian feminism
 Lesbian literature
 :Category:Lesbian organizations
 List of lesbian periodicals

References

External links
 Common Lives/Lesbian Lives Records, Iowa Women's Archives, University of Iowa Libraries

1981 in LGBT history
Defunct magazines published in the United States
Feminism in the United States
Feminist magazines
Intersectional feminism
Lesbian feminist literature
Lesbian history in the United States
Lesbian working-class culture
LGBT in Iowa
LGBT literature in the United States
Magazines established in 1981
Magazines disestablished in 1996
Magazines published in Los Angeles
Magazines published in Iowa
Multicultural feminism
Women in Iowa